Anthony James "A.J." Soares (born November 28, 1988) is an American retired soccer player who played as a center back for Orange County Blue Star, New England Revolution, Viking and AGF.

Career

Early life, college and amateur
Soares was born in Solana Beach, California. He attended Torrey Pines High School where he was the captain for his junior and senior seasons, and won the 2005 Division 1 CIF Championship.

He played college soccer at the University of California, Berkeley. As the Cal co-captain in 2010, Soares was named a National Soccer Coaches Association of America First Team All American, Pac-10 Player of the Year, Goal.com Player of the Year. Soares entered college at California as an attacking player, but head coach Kevin Grimes converted him to a central defender because of his size and strength. However, he still managed to score five goals in his final collegiate season while anchoring a stingy Bear defense; during this campaign, he was named a semifinalist for the 2010 Hermann Trophy.

In 2010 Soares made one appearance for Orange County Blue Star in the USL Premier Development League.

Professional
Soares was chosen by New England Revolution as the sixth overall pick in the 2011 MLS SuperDraft.
He was voted New England's Defensive MVP in 2011.
Soares started and played the entire 2014 MLS Cup.
Soares was voted "Player's Player" and Defender of the Year for New England in 2014.

In February 2015, Soares was presented as the newest addition to the Norwegian Tippeligaen club Viking FK.
On July 26, 2016, Soares signed a two-year contract with AGF.

In November 2016, he retired from professional football, due to a serious head injury.

Personal life
Soares' father is Portuguese and was born in the Azores. He also holds an Italian passport.

References

External links
 
 Cal bio
 

1988 births
Living people
All-American men's college soccer players
American people of Azorean descent
American soccer players
Association football defenders
California Golden Bears men's soccer players
Eliteserien players
Danish Superliga players
Major League Soccer players
New England Revolution draft picks
New England Revolution players
Orange County Blue Star players
USL League Two players
Soccer players from California
Viking FK players
Aarhus Gymnastikforening players
American expatriate soccer players
Expatriate footballers in Norway
American expatriate sportspeople in Norway
Expatriate men's footballers in Denmark
American expatriate sportspeople in Denmark

American people of Portuguese descent